STS-41-C (formerly STS-13) was NASA's eleventh Space Shuttle mission, and the fifth mission of Space Shuttle Challenger. The launch, which took place on April 6, 1984, marked the first direct ascent trajectory for a Space Shuttle mission. During the mission, Challengers crew captured and repaired the malfunctioning Solar Maximum Mission ("Solar Max") satellite, and deployed the Long Duration Exposure Facility (LDEF) experimental apparatus. STS-41-C was extended one day due to problems capturing the Solar Max satellite, and the landing on April 13, 1984, took place at Edwards Air Force Base, instead of at Kennedy Space Center as had been planned. The flight was originally numbered STS-13.

Crew

Spacewalks 
EVA 1
 Personnel: Nelson and van Hoften
 Date: April 8, 1984 (14:18–17:17 UTC)
 Duration: 2 hours, 59 minutes

EVA 2
 Personnel: Nelson and van Hoften
 Date: April 11, 1984 (08:58–16:05 UTC)
 Duration: 7 hours, 7 minutes

Crew seating arrangements

Mission summary 

STS-41-C launched successfully at 8:58 a.m. EST on April 6, 1984. The mission marked the first direct ascent trajectory for the Space Shuttle; Challenger reached its  - high orbit using its Orbiter Maneuvering System (OMS) engines only once, to circularize its orbit. During the ascent phase, the main computer in Mission control center (MCC) failed, as did the backup computer. For about an hour, the controllers had no data on the orbiter.

The flight had two primary objectives. The first was to deploy the Long Duration Exposure Facility (LDEF), a passive, retrievable, 12-sided experimental cylinder. The second objective of STS-41-C was to capture, repair and redeploy the malfunctioning Solar Maximum Mission satellite ("Solar Max"), which had been launched in 1980.

On the second day of the flight, the LDEF was grappled by the Remote Manipulator System (Canadarm) and successfully released into orbit. Its 57 experiments, mounted in 86 removable trays, were contributed by 200 researchers from eight countries. Retrieval of the passive LDEF was initially scheduled for 1985, but schedule delays and the Challenger disaster of 1986 postponed the retrieval until January 12, 1990, when Columbia retrieved the LDEF during STS-32.

Astronauts Nelson and van Hoften, wearing space suits, entered the payload bay. Nelson, using the Manned Maneuvering Unit (MMU), flew out to the satellite and attempted to grasp it with a special capture tool, called the Trunnion Pin Acquisition Device (TPAD). Three attempts to clamp the TPAD onto the satellite failed. Solar Max began tumbling on multiple axes when Nelson attempted to grab one of the satellite's solar arrays by hand, and the effort was called off. Crippen had to perform multiple maneuvers of the orbiter to keep up with Nelson and Solar Max, and nearly ran out of RCS fuel.

During the night of the third day, the Solar Max Payload Operations Control Center (POCC), located at Goddard Space Flight Center (GSFC), Greenbelt, Maryland, was able to establish control over the satellite by sending commands ordering the satellite's magnetorquers to stabilize its tumbling. This was successful, and Solar Max went into a slow, regular spin. The next day, Crippen maneuvered Challenger back to Solar Max, and Hart was able to grapple the satellite with the RMS. They placed Solar Max on a special cradle in the payload bay using the RMS. Nelson and van Hoften then began the repair operation, replacing the satellite's attitude control mechanism and the main electronics system of the coronagraph instrument. The ultimately successful repair effort took two separate spacewalks. Solar Max was deployed back into orbit the next day. After a 30-day checkout by the Goddard POCC, the satellite resumed full operation.

Other STS-41-C mission activities included a student experiment located in a middeck locker which found that honeybees can successfully make honeycomb cells in a microgravity environment. Highlights of the mission, including the LDEF deployment and the Solar Max repair, were filmed using an IMAX movie camera, and the results appeared in the 1985 IMAX movie The Dream is Alive.

The 6 days, 23 hours, 40 minutes, and 7 seconds mission ended on April 13, 1984, at 5:38 a.m. PST, when Challenger landed safely on Runway 17, at Edwards Air Force Base, having completed 108 orbits. Challenger was returned to KSC on April 18, 1984.

Wake-up calls 

NASA began a tradition of playing music to astronauts during the Project Gemini, and first used music to wake up a flight crew during Apollo 15. Each track is specially chosen, often by the astronauts' families, and usually has a special meaning to an individual member of the crew, or is applicable to their daily activities.

See also 

 List of human spaceflights
 List of Space Shuttle missions
 Lists of spacewalks and moonwalks

References

External links 

 STS-41-C press kit  NASA
 STS-41-C mission summary  NASA
 STS-41-C video highlights  NSS
 The Dream is Alive (1985) IMDb
 STS-41-C NST Program Mission Report NASA

Space Shuttle missions
Edwards Air Force Base
1984 in spaceflight
1984 in science
1984 in the United States
Spacecraft launched in 1984
Spacecraft which reentered in 1984
Articles containing video clips
Satellite servicing missions